Killington Mountain Resort & Ski Area is a ski resort in Rutland County, Vermont, United States, near the town of Killington. Since the 2013–14 ski season, it has been called the "Beast of the East."

History
In 1954, Perry H. Merrill, known as the Father of Vermont's State Parks and Alpine Ski Areas and Vermont State's land lease officer, wanted to see a ski resort developed on Killington Peak, the second highest mountain in Vermont. Preston Leete Smith agreed to work with him to develop this area. Killington opened on December 13, 1958.

The resort expanded in the 1960s at a pace "well above industry standards." Many new trails were created and Smith had beginner trails accessible from every lift. In the 1960s, Killington installed snowmaking equipment, which had been invented in the 1950s, but was considered a banana belt luxury. Several low-snow seasons proved their value.

Killington introduced the ticket wicket in 1963 to prevent skiers sharing lift tickets, while also not damaging ski clothing.

In the summer of 2011, the Killington area was damaged by Tropical Storm Irene in late August, which caused flooding and damage along U.S. Route 4, the road leading into Killington. The resort was damaged by excess runoff from Ottauquechee River, which lifted the Superstar Pub off of its foundation, condemning the structure. Killington has since repaired damaged infrastructure, and is operating at full or near-full potential.

Ownership 
The last mention of the development of Killington Village was in February 2014 when SP Land Company, LLC. filed its Act 250 permit application for the $133.4 million Phase 1 of development, along with the conceptual Killington Village Master Plan and a revised application for what is referred to as the Overall Subdivision.

Shortly after the acquisition in 2007, Powdr announced that it will stop honoring "lifetime" lift passes issued by the previous owners after two years. A class action lawsuit was filed on behalf of about 800 pass holders.

Skiing Killington

Located in central Vermont, Killington has 155 trails, 21 lifts, and  extending across six interconnected mountain peaks. A seventh peak, Pico Mountain, was purchased by Killington in 1996, but operates as a separate resort on the same lift tickets. There have been several proposals to connect Killington and Pico with a series of lifts and trails since 1998, however, no plans have been finalized.

The mountains that make up the Killington resort separate the town of Killington (with its access road) from the city of Rutland.

Trails
The resort offers trails ranging from beginner to expert. Trails include "Outer Limits" a double black diamond mogul trail. Part of the mountain is set aside for terrain parks, with five snowboard and alpine parks. Killington has a learning area for first-time skiers, the "Accelerated Learning Area".

Killington has one of the east's largest half-pipes located at Bear Mountain for a portion of each winter season. There are boarder cross terrain and at least three to five major trails with ramps and jumps.

Famed ski map creator, James Niehues, hand-painted the Killington ski map in 1990.

Mountains

Snowshed, devoted to beginners, is serviced by two lifts, however one rarely runs. Snowshed is an open slope, with a lodge and restaurant at the bottom. The adult ski school is located at Snowshed. And the Killington Grand quarter share Hotel is located at the bottom of Snowshed.
 Ramshead mountain features beginner and intermediate terrain serviced by an Poma express quad lift, and a Poma platter lift for the racing training on Swirl trail. The Ski School for children and teenagers is located at Ramshead base lodge. "Squeeze Play" is an easy gladed trail with wide gaps between trees and a relatively flat profile. 
 Snowdon Mountain provides a variety of beginner, intermediate and expert trails. Among the trails are Conclusion, rated double black diamond, and Great Northern, a beginner trail. There are two chairlifts (a Heron-Poma triple from K-1 and a Detachable Six-Pack with blue bubble chairs from end of Caper.
 Killington Peak, the highest of the six mountain peaks, includes the "Canyon Area", near the top, with some of the steepest terrain on the mountain. There are several double black diamond trails there, including Cascade, Downdraft, Double Dipper, and the Big Dipper Glade. It is serviced by the Pona of America built K-1 gondola, North ridge triple the Canyon Quad. Two shorter runs here include Rime and Reason in North Ridge area. Easier trails (Bear Trax and Great Northern) connect this peak to the rest of the mountain. There are lodges with restaurants at both the summit and base of Killington Peak. The peak was once accessible only by the original Killington gondola, which featured three stages, beginning at the bottom of the current Skyeship gondola. It has since been replaced by the two shorter gondolas. The K-1 gondola replaces the earlier Killington peak double chairlift, while the Skyeship gondola took the place of the first two stages of the original in the same alignment.

 Skye Peak includes every type of terrain available. Trails include upper Vertigo, the steepest non-gladed trail at Killington, Ovation, a black forming into a double black when it becomes Lower Ovation, which is also one of the steepest trails on the mountain, and Superstar, a black diamond that is wide and has much artificial snowmaking to hold one of the longest skiing seasons in the US, normally closing at the end of May. It is serviced by the Yan built Superstar Express Quad, the 2008 Leitner-Poma Skye Peak Express Quad, and the Skyeship Express Gondola, erected in 1994. 
 Bear Mountain which is home to Outer Limits, a very steep double black diamond mogul run which is home to the Bear mountain Mogul challenge, and Devil's Fiddle, another double black diamond. Bear Mountain also features terrain parks, including a superpipe. It was once served by two lifts, a quad and triple until 2008 and now is serviced by one quad lift and has a lodge and restaurant. Bear Mountain frequently hosts large-scale competitive racing and freestyle events.

 Sunrise Mountain: Sunrise Mountain is serviced by one lift and is all beginner terrain. It was developed in the early 1980s with the Northeast Passage lift, the world's longest triple chair, but due to the relatively low elevation, Killington had difficulty maintaining snow cover on the lower portions, so they were removed from the trail system. The triple chair, which originally extended further downhill to the southern corner of US-4 and VT-100 in W. Bridgewater, was shortened, and the "Northeast Passage" entrance to Killington ceased to exist in the late 1990s. The upper portion of the lift was bought by Sunrise condos and provides them with direct access to the rest of the mountain. Killington originally opened Sunrise with the intention of expanding skiing trails and lifts southeast into an area known as Parker's Gore. When these plans were halted due to concerns for bear habitat, the costs of snowmaking and maintaining terrain at such a low elevation were no longer justified by the few skiers utilizing the area.

Pico Mountain

Pico Mountain is located on a separate mountain, Pico Peak, several miles away from the main resort. It has 57 trails covering , all serviced by seven lifts. Runs include The Pike, 49er, Summit Glades, Upper KA, Giant Killer, and Sunset 71. There are hotels, condos and restaurants at the base. The mountain is accessible from the main base by car or bus.

Pico was once an independent ski resort called Pico Peak, and was bought out of bankruptcy by American Skiing Company which also owned Killington in the mid-1990s. Upon the collapse of ASC, Powdr Corp. bought both mountains and continues to operate them. Lift tickets at Killington are currently valid at Pico. There have been plans to connect Pico to the main Killington resort since it was purchased. Connector trails have been cut. Combined the two resorts offer over 1977 acres of ski able terrain.

Snow and season length
Killington averages  of natural snow each winter, coupled with a snowmaking system that covers 71% of the trails. This  has allowed Killington to offer what is often the longest skiing season in eastern North America, which usually spans from late October to late May, over 200 days. It has opened as early as October 1 and closed as late as June 22.  Killington had a reputation for being the first ski area every season in the eastern U.S. to open, as well as the last to close, although in recent years the length of the season has begun to shorten. For example, in the 15 years between 1986 and 2001, the resort opened in October in every year but one, and never closed earlier than May 21. But in the five years ending in 2011, opening day has always been in November, and closing day has never made it past May 6. The years after 2011 have reversed this trend slightly with the 2019 season ending June 2nd and the 2022 season ending June 4th. The 2020 season ended early on March 14 due to the Covid 19 pandemic.

World Cup races
Since November 2016, Killington has hosted the World Cup tour, with women's technical events (giant slalom, slalom) on Thanksgiving weekend, held on the "Superstar" run. American Mikaela Shiffrin won the slalom events in each of the first four years.
{|class="wikitable" style="text-align:center; font-size:95%;"
|-
! Season
! Date
! Giant Slalom Winner
!  
! Date
! Slalom Winner
|-
| 2017||align=right|26 Nov 2016|| align=left| Tessa Worley ||rowspan=10 style="background:#E6E8FA;"| || align=right|27 Nov 2016|| align=left| Mikaela Shiffrin
|-
| 2018||align=right|25 Nov 2017|| align=left| Viktoria Rebensburg ||align=right|26 Nov 2017|| align=left| Mikaela Shiffrin
|-
| 2019||align=right|24 Nov 2018|| align=left| Federica Brignone ||align=right|25 Nov 2018|| align=left| Mikaela Shiffrin
|-
| 2020||align=right|30 Nov 2019|| align=left| Marta Bassino ||   align=right|01 Dec 2019|| align=left| Mikaela Shiffrin 
|}
Prior to 2016, the most recent World Cup races in the eastern U.S. were in March 1991 at Waterville Valley in New Hampshire; the last in Vermont were in March 1978 at Stratton Mountain.

Mountain statistics
 Summit elevation (Killington Peak)  
 Pico Peak – 
 Skye Peak – 
 Ramshead Peak – 
 Snowdon Peak – 
 Bear Mountain – 
 Sunrise Mountain –

Trails
 212 trails (including Pico Mountain) measuring 
 – Easier 28%
 – More Difficult 33%
 – Most Difficult: 39%

Lift roster
Killington has 21 Lifts.

Summer
Killington has  of hiking and mountain biking trails,  and an 18-hole golf course. It also has lift accessed mountain biking in the summer with technical trail features, jumps, and other obstacles. In March 2015, the resort successfully applied to the state for permit allowing them to add zip lines and a mountain coaster.

Image gallery

References

External links
 
 History of Killington Mt – VT Living Magazine
 Killington – NewEnglandSkiHistory.com – history and photos

Ski areas and resorts in Vermont
Killington, Vermont
Buildings and structures in Rutland County, Vermont
Tourist attractions in Rutland County, Vermont
1958 establishments in Vermont